Raymond Bussières (3 November 1907 – 29 April 1982) was a French film actor. He appeared in more than 160 films between 1933 and 1982. He was born in Ivry-la-Bataille and died in Paris. He is buried in Marchenoir. He was married to the actress Annette Poivre.

Selected filmography

 Ciboulette (1933)
 Lights of Paris (1938)
 Romance of Paris (1941)
 The Murderer Lives at 21 (1942)
 The Stairs Without End (1943)
 Pamela (1945)
 The Last Judgment (1945)
 The Two Orphans (1947)
 Le Bataillon du ciel (1947)
 Cab Number 13 (1948)
 I Like Only You (1949)
 Marlene (1949)
 Five Red Tulips (1949)
 Branquignol (1949)
 Justice Is Done (1950)
 Moumou (1951)
 The Nude Dancer (1952)
 Les Belles de nuit (1952)
 Casque d'or (1952)
 The Porter from Maxim's (1953)
 My Brother from Senegal (1953)
 The Enchanting Enemy (1953)
 The Lottery of Happiness (1953)
 The Tour of the Grand Dukes (1953)
 Ah! Les belles bacchantes (1954)
 It's the Paris Life (1954)
 The Pirates of the Bois de Boulogne (1954)
 Meeting in Paris (1956)
 Paris, Palace Hotel (1956)
 Taxi, Roulotte et Corrida (1958)
 A Certain Monsieur Jo (1958)
 Three Fables of Love (1962)
 Paris - When It Sizzles (1964)
 The Counterfeit Constable (1964)
 The Curse of Belphegor (1967)
 The Man Who Quit Smoking (1972)
 Return of Halleluja (1972)
 Run, Run, Joe! (1974)
 Serious as Pleasure (1975)
 Dracula and Son (1976)
 Golden Night (1976)
 Jonah Who Will Be 25 in the Year 2000 (1976)
 L'Argent des Autres (1978)
 Le Roi et l'oiseau (1980)
 Neige (1981)
 Invitation au voyage (1982)

References

External links

1907 births
1982 deaths
French male film actors
People from Eure
20th-century French male actors